Chung Un-chan (born March 21, 1947 in Gongju, South Chungcheong Province, South Korea) is a South Korean politician who was the Prime Minister of South Korea (2009–2010). He was a professor of Seoul National University from 1978 to 2009, serving as the president of the university from July 2002 to July 2006 until he was designated to the Prime Minister. He is the current commissioner of the Korea Baseball Organization.

Professional life

Academic career
Prior to his appointment as Seoul National University president, Chung was dean of the college of social sciences in the first half of 2002. From 1993 to 1994, he was associate dean at the college. Dr. Chung was a visiting associate professor at the University of Hawaii in 1983, a visiting scholar at the London School of Economics from 1986 to 1987, and a visiting professor at Ruhr-Universitat Bochum (Germany) in 1999. Dr. Chung earned a B.A. in economics at Seoul National University in 1970, and an M.A. in economics at Miami University (Ohio) in 1972. Chung received a Ph.D. in economics from Princeton University in 1978 after completing a doctoral dissertation titled "Toward a theory of the price setting banking firm." In October 2004, Dr. Chung was awarded an honorary degree in international education at the Far Eastern National University in Vladivostok, Russia. Dr. Chung continues to write and conduct research in macroeconomics and financial markets. He has numerous publications in both Korean and English.

Public official and educational administrator
Dr. Chung has held senior positions in government commissions and private research institutions. In 2002, Dr. Chung was Chairman of the Committee on National Pension Development. From 2000 to 2001, he served as Chairman of the Financial Development Committee at the Ministry of Finance and Economy. Since 1996, Dr. Chung has served as Director of the Suam Educational and Cultural Foundation. From 1998 to 2001, Dr. Chung was Director of the Korea Council of Economic and Social Research Institutes. And from 1998 to 1999, Dr. Chung was President of the Korean Money and Finance Association. In addition, Dr. Chung was a senior advisor for the Seoul Metropolitan Government's Policy Advisory Committee from 1995 to 1997.

Dr. Chung began his academic career as a business associate and assistant professor at Columbia University from 1976 to 1978. After three years of teaching Money and Financial Markets at the university, Dr. Chung returned to Seoul National University in late 1978, where he has taught for 27 years on the faculty of economics.

Political career
Chung had topped the list of potential candidates the ruling Uri Party (now Democratic Party) camp would like to recruit at the 2007 presidential election, but he didn't enter the party.

On September 3, 2009, Chung was nominated as Prime Minister of South Korea by president Lee Myung-bak. At the parliamentary confirmation hearing, he said that a government plan to relocate nine ministries and four major administration bodies to the newly created Sejong City in central South Korea would lead to nationwide inefficiency. Opposition parties including Democratic Party threatened to vote against him, but he was approved in the National Assembly of South Korea and assumed office as the 40th prime minister on September 30, 2009.

After assuming office, Sejong city plan had faced uphill political battle and opposition parties vowed Saturday to their struggle against him. After local elections in June 2010, he expressed willingness to resign. He offered his resignation on July 29 and stepped down on August 10 after 10 months of bitter political experience.

Private life 
Chung is a fan of baseball. He is a fan of the Doosan Bears, the Korean baseball team, and the New York Yankees.

References

External links 
 Official bio
 Seoul National University
 The Korea Times: SNU Narrows Presidential Search to Two Professors (May 11, 2006)
 Prime Minister of South Korea web page (Korean) 

|-

Presidents of Seoul National University
Academic staff of Seoul National University
Columbia University faculty
20th-century South Korean economists
Princeton University alumni
Miami University alumni
Seoul National University alumni
Kyunggi High School alumni
People from Gongju
1946 births
Living people
21st-century South Korean economists